Hello Everything is the eighth album by Squarepusher, released on 16 October 2006 on Warp. Prior to its release, three downloadable singles were made available from Bleep (Warp's download store) — "Welcome to Europe", "Hanningfield Window" and "Exciton"; the last two are exclusive to the Japanese version of the album. All three tracks were released on the 12" vinyl single Welcome to Europe. Limited editions of the album included a bonus 3" CD, Vacuum Tracks. This bonus material consists of five drone tracks similar to the track "Vacuum Garden".

The song "Hello Meow" is used for Adult Swim's "Next Sunday on [adult swim]" bumpers, and "Welcome to Europe" has been used in commercials for the network's evening lineup.

The song "Planetarium" is used as the music intro for the French video game show "Chez Marcus" on channel Nolife, and in the video game LittleBigPlanet 2.

Track listing

Vacuum Tracks

References

External links
Hello Everything at the Warp Records website
"Hello Meow" live at Koko, London 2006 (video)

Squarepusher albums
2006 albums
Warp (record label) albums